Yuan Shizhong (died 1643) was a rebel leader in the 1640s, the later Ming dynasty, China. A Henan native, he gathered a peasant army against the Ming government. In 1643, he briefly joined Li Zicheng, but left before the Battle of Kaifeng. He was killed by Li Guo, a general of Li Zicheng.

See also
Li Zicheng

Ming dynasty rebels
Generals from Henan
17th-century Chinese people
1643 deaths
Year of birth unknown